Gryposcleroma is a genus of moths belonging to the family Tortricidae.

Species
Gryposcleroma schidia Razowski, 1986

See also
List of Tortricidae genera

References

External links
tortricidae.com

Cochylini
Tortricidae genera